In quantum mechanics (and computation), a weak value is a quantity related to a shift of a measuring device's pointer when usually there is pre- and postselection. It should not be confused with a weak measurement, which is often defined in conjunction. The weak value was first defined by Yakir Aharonov, David Albert, and Lev Vaidman, published in Physical Review Letters 1988, and is related to the two-state vector formalism. There is also a way to obtain weak values without postselection.

Definition and Derivation
There are many excellent review articles on weak values (see e.g. ) here we briefly cover the basics.

Definition
We will refer to the initial and final states of the system as the pre- and post-selected quantum mechanical states. With respect to these states, the weak value of the observable  is defined as:

Notice that if  then the weak value is equal to the usual expected value in the initial state  or the final state . In general the weak value quantity is a complex number. The weak value of the observable becomes large when the post-selected state, approaches being orthogonal to the pre-selected state, i.e. .

As an example consider a spin 1/2 particle. Take  to be the Pauli Z operator  with eigenvalues . Using the initial state

and the final state

we can calculate the weak value to be

For  the weak value is anomalous.

Derivation
Here we follow the presentation given by Duck, Stevenson, and Sudarshan, (with some notational updates from Kofman et al. )which makes explicit when the approximations used to derive the weak value are valid.

Consider a quantum system that you want to measure by coupling an ancillary (also quantum) measuring device. The system and ancilla are coupled via the Hamiltonian

The Hamiltonian generates the unitary

Take the initial state of the ancilla to have a Gaussian distribution

the position wavefunction of this state is

Next the system and ancilla interact via the unitary . After this one performs a projective measurement of the projectors  on the system. If we postselect (or condition) on getting the outcome , then the (unnormalized) final state of the meter is

On line (II) we use the approximation that  for small . This final approximation is only valid when

As  is the generator of translations, the ancilla's wavefunction is now given by

This is the original wavefunction, shifted by an amount . By Busch's theorem the system and meter wavefunctions are necessarily disturbed by the measurement. There is a certain sense in which the protocol that allows one to measure the weak value is minimally disturbing, but there is still disturbance.

Applications

Quantum metrology and tomography
At the end of the original weak value paper the authors suggested weak values could be used in quantum metrology:

This suggestion was followed by Hosten and Kwiat and later by Dixon et al. It appears to be an interesting line of research that could result in improved quantum sensing technology.

Additionally in 2011, weak measurements of many photons prepared in the same pure state, followed by strong measurements of a complementary variable, were used to perform quantum tomography (i.e. reconstruct the state in which the photons were prepared).

Quantum foundations

Weak values have been used to examine some of the paradoxes in the foundations of quantum theory. This relies to a large extent on whether weak values are deemed to be relevant to describe properties of quantum systems, a point which is not obvious since weak values are generally different from eigenvalues. For example, the research group of Aephraim Steinberg at the University of Toronto confirmed Hardy's paradox experimentally using joint weak measurement of the locations of entangled pairs of photons. (also see)

Building on weak measurements, Howard M. Wiseman proposed a weak value measurement of the velocity of a quantum particle at a precise position, which he termed its "naïvely observable velocity". In 2010, a first experimental observation of trajectories of a photon in a double-slit interferometer was reported, which displayed the qualitative features predicted in 2001 by Partha Ghose for photons in the de Broglie-Bohm interpretation. Following up on Wiseman's weak velocity measurement, Johannes Fankhauser and Patrick Dürr suggest in a paper that weak velocity measurements constitute no new arguments, let alone empirical evidence, in favor of or against standard de Broglie-Bohm theory. According to the authors such measurements could not provide direct experimental evidence displaying the shape of particle trajectories, even if it is assumed that some deterministic particle trajectories exist.

Quantum computation 
Weak values have been implemented into quantum computing to get a giant speed up in time complexity. In a paper,  Arun Kumar Pati describes a new kind of quantum computer using weak value amplification and post-selection (WVAP), and implements search algorithm which (given a successful post selection) can find the target state in a single run with time complexity , beating out the well known Grover's algorithm.

Criticisms 

Criticisms of weak values include philosophical and practical criticisms. Some noted researchers such as Asher Peres, Tony Leggett, David Mermin, and Charles H. Bennett are critical of weak values also:

 Stephen Parrott questions the meaning and usefulness of weak measurements, as described above.
 Sokolovski

Recently, it has been shown that the pre- and postselection of a quantum
system recovers a completely hidden interference phenomenon in the measurement
apparatus. Studying the interference pattern shows that what is interpreted
as an amplification using the weak value is a pure phase effect and
the weak value plays no role in its interpretation. This phase effect
increases the degree of the entanglement which lies behind the effectiveness
of the pre- and postselection in the parameter estimation.

Further reading

References

Quantum information science
Quantum measurement